Hunter Schryver (born April 3, 1995) is an American former professional baseball pitcher.

Amateur career
Schryver attended Cumberland Valley High School in Mechanicsburg, Pennsylvania, where he earned all-state honors in baseball as a senior in 2013. He played college baseball at Villanova University. As a senior at Villanova in 2017, he started 12 games and went 4-6 with a 2.44 ERA. Following the season's end, he was selected by the Tampa Bay Rays in the seventh round of the 2017 Major League Baseball draft.

Professional career
Schryver signed with the Rays and made his professional debut with the Hudson Valley Renegades of the Class A Short Season New York–Penn League, going 4-0 with a 3.12 ERA and 38 strikeouts over  relief innings. To begin the 2018 season, he was assigned to the Bowling Green Hot Rods of the Class A Midwest League and was promoted to the Charlotte Stone Crabs of the Class A-Advanced Florida State League during the season.

On July 31, 2018, Schryver was traded to the Chicago White Sox in exchange for international signing pool bonus money. He was assigned to the Winston-Salem Dash of the Class A-Advanced Carolina League. Over  innings between Bowling Green, Charlotte, and Winston-Salem, he went 1-5 with a 2.12 ERA, eighty strikeouts, and 11 saves. In 2019, he began the year with the Birmingham Barons of the Class AA Southern League before being promoted to the Charlotte Knights of the Class AAA International League. Schryver pitched to a 3-2 record and a 4.04 ERA over  innings pitched in relief between both teams. In February 2020, he underwent Tommy John Surgery which would have forced him to miss the 2020 minor league season had it not been cancelled due to the COVID-19 pandemic. For the 2021 season, Schryver returned to Charlotte, making forty relief appearances and compiling a 1-0 record, a 4.98 ERA, and 48 strikeouts over  innings. He returned to Charlotte to begin the 2022 season.

On September 12, 2022, Schryver announced his retirement from baseball. Over his minor league career, he posted a 3.55 ERA and 261 strikeouts.

References

External links

Minor league baseball players
1995 births
Living people
Baseball pitchers
Baseball players from Pennsylvania
Villanova Wildcats baseball players
Hudson Valley Renegades players
Bowling Green Hot Rods players
Charlotte Stone Crabs players
Winston-Salem Dash players
Birmingham Barons players
Charlotte Knights players
Glendale Desert Dogs players